The Norway national futsal team is controlled by the Football Association of Norway, the governing body for futsal in Norway and represents the country in international futsal competitions, such as the World Cup and the European Championships.

Tournament records

FIFA Futsal World Cup

UEFA Futsal Championship

References

External links
The Norwegian Football Association (NFF)

Norway
F
Futsal in Norway